Primo Magnani (31 March 1892 – 17 June 1969) was an Italian racing cyclist and Olympic champion in track cycling.

He won a gold medal in the team pursuit at the 1920 Summer Olympics in Antwerp (with Arnaldo Carli, Ruggero Ferrario and Franco Giorgetti). Magnani also participated in the 50 kilometres competition but his exact result is unknown.

References

External links

1892 births
1969 deaths
Italian male cyclists
Italian track cyclists
Olympic cyclists of Italy
Cyclists at the 1920 Summer Olympics
Olympic gold medalists for Italy
Sportspeople from Pavia
Olympic medalists in cycling
Medalists at the 1920 Summer Olympics
Cyclists from the Province of Pavia